Avery Yale Kamila is an American journalist, vegan columnist and community organizer in the state of Maine.

Biography 
Kamila was born in Westminster, Massachusetts in the 1970s and grew up on an organic farm in Litchfield, Maine. Kamila adopted a vegan diet in 1991 after reading “Diet for a New America,” while she was a freshman studying journalism at Syracuse University's S. I. Newhouse School of Public Communications. She graduated from State University of New York College of Environmental Science and Forestry in 1995 with a degree in Environment Policy and Management. Kamila is married to Adam Hill and they have a son. She lives in Portland, Maine.

Journalism
Kamila is a journalist who wrote the Natural Foodie column for the Portland Press Herald in Portland, Maine, the largest newspaper in Maine, for many years starting in 2009. At one time, she wrote the Society Notebook column for the Maine Sunday Telegram. Kamila currently writes the Vegan Kitchen  column for the Portland Press Herald food & dining section.

A column Kamila wrote in 2018 about the lack of vegan school meal options convinced the Portland Public Schools to add hot vegan choices. The column upset some readers. The district's superintendent endorsed the idea on Twitter. The national media coverage of the vegan school lunches in Portland cited them as part of a national trend.

Kamila's recipe for pumpkin seed croquettes with shiitake mushroom gravy is included in the "Maine Bicentennial Community Cookbook: 200 Recipes Celebrating Maine's Culinary Past, Present & Future," compiled and edited by Margaret Hathaway and Karl Schatz and published by Islandport Press.

In 2020, Victoria Moran interviewed Kamila on her Main Street Vegan podcast about Maine's vegetarian history. Moran said: "Recently, she’s been researching the history of vegetarianism in her home state and uncovered a rich past full of meat-free and plant-based eating that has been ignored and buried for more than 100 years." Kamila's research has uncovered information about Dr. Horace A. Barrows, Rev. Henry Aiken Worcester, and James Gower, born in 1772 and the great-great-great-great grandfather of Alaska Gov. Sarah Palin.

The American Vegan Society said Kamila's history claims that nut milk is America's first milk because of the history of plant milk making within the Wabanaki tribal nations "shows how the historical record was unwittingly distorted to mask this proto-vegan tradition."

She has written about the history of Seventh-day Adventist prophet who was raised in Maine Ellen G. White and stated in 2022 that White's "lasting influence on vegetarian food in the United States continues today." In 2015, Loma Linda University said a profile Kamila had written about White's contributions to religion and health was an "example of the wider cultural recognition of Ellen White’s continuing impact on contemporary life."

Community activism 
In 2015, Kamila and Maggie Knowles co-founded a grassroots group called Portland Protectors. In 2017, Kamila was featured as a speaker at the March for Science in Portland, Maine. The group convinced the Portland City Council in 2018 to pass a strict pesticide ordinance that mandates organic lawns and gardens within the city.

References

External links 

 Avery Yale Kamila's Vegan Kitchen column, Portland Press Herald

1970s births
Living people
Writers from Portland, Maine
American veganism activists
American women journalists
Activists from Portland, Maine
People from Litchfield, Maine
Journalists from Maine
21st-century American women
S.I. Newhouse School of Public Communications alumni
State University of New York College of Environmental Science and Forestry alumni